Myriam Nicole (born 8 February 1990) is a French downhill mountain bike racer.

She won the downhill race at the 2019 UCI Mountain Bike World Championships in Mont-Sainte-Anne, Quebec, Canada. and again at the 2021 Championships in Val di Sole, Italy. She also won the bronze medal in 2018 and the silver medal in 2020.

She also won the 2017 UCI Downhill World Cup.

She is a trained physiotherapist, although she admits she doesn't see herself working in a clinic, but rather with athletes in the field.

References

External links
 
 

1990 births
Living people
French female cyclists
Downhill mountain bikers
Université Savoie-Mont Blanc alumni
French mountain bikers
UCI Mountain Bike World Champions (women)
Sportspeople from Montpellier
Cyclists from Occitania (administrative region)
20th-century French women
21st-century French women